Sinatra: The Main Event was an ABC musical television special starring Frank Sinatra broadcast on October 13, 1974. The special documents a concert given by Sinatra at Madison Square Garden in New York City, in which Sinatra is accompanied by the Woody Herman band, and introduced by Howard Cosell.

The concert that was broadcast, was the last of a series of six that Sinatra gave at Madison Square Garden in October 1974, the audio from the concerts had also been taped and the highlights would be released as The Main Event – Live. The saxophonist Jerry Doidgson who performed on the concerts felt that the televised performance wasn't as strong as the others as Sinatra's natural pacing of the concert was disrupted by the mechanisms of television production.

Track List
 Introduction by Howard Cosell: "It Was a Very Good Year"/"All the Way"/"My Kind of Town"
 "The Lady Is a Tramp"
 "I Get a Kick Out of You"
 "Let Me Try Again"
 "Autumn in New York"
 "I've Got You Under My Skin"
 "Bad, Bad Leroy Brown"
 "Angel Eyes"
 "You Are the Sunshine of My Life"
 "The House I Live In"
 "My Kind of Town"
 "My Way"

References

External links

1974 in American television
1974 television specials
1970s American television specials
American Broadcasting Company television specials
Frank Sinatra television specials
Music of New York City